The NeOn Toolkit is an open source, multi-platform ontology editor, which supports the development of ontologies in F-Logic and OWL/RDF. The editor is based on the Eclipse platform and provides a set of plug-ins (currently 20 plug-ins are available for the latest version, v2.4) covering a number of ontology engineering activities, including Annotation and Documentation, Modularization and Customization, Reuse, Ontology Evolution, translation and others. 

The NeOn Toolkit has been developed in the course of the EU-funded NeOn project and is currently maintained and distributed by the NeOn Technologies Foundation.

References

External links 
 NeOn Technologies Foundation
 NeOn Toolkit Website
 NeOn Project Website

Knowledge representation
Free integrated development environments
Ontology (information science)
Ontology editors
Free software programmed in Java (programming language)